The Liga Nacional de Básquet Statistical Leaders are the statistical leaders in various different categories of Argentina's top-tier level men's professional club basketball league, the Liga Nacional de Básquet (LNB), or "La Liga".

All-time leaders

Most games played
As of 5 Dec 2018; player nationality by national team:

All-Time top scorers
As of Dec 2018; player nationality by national team:

Top Scorers by season
Player nationality by national team:

Top rebounders by season

Championships won by head coach

Players with the most championships won
Player nationality by national team:
10×:  Leo Gutiérrez: (1996, 1999, 2002, 2005, 2007, 2009, 2010,  2011, 2012, 2014)
7×:  Héctor Campana: (1987, 1988, 1990, 1991, 1992, 1998, 1999)
7×:  Marcelo Milanesio: (1987, 1988, 1990, 1992, 1998, 1999, 2002)
6×:  Diego Osella: (1988, 1990, 1992, 1998, 1999, 2009)
6×:  Martín Leiva: (2004, 2007, 2010, 2011, 2012, 2014)
6x:  Marcos Mata: (2010, 2011, 2012, 2016, 2017, 2018)
5×:  Gustavo Ismael Fernández: (1991, 1993, 1997, 2000, 2001)
5×:  Bruno Lábaque: (1998, 1999, 2002, 2003, 2009)
5×:  Diego Maggi: (1985, 1986, 1989, 1991, 1994)
4×:  Andrés Pelussi: (1998, 2002, 2003, 2008)
4×:  Germán Filloy: (1987, 1988, 1990, 1992)
4×:  Alejandro Reinick: (2003, 2010, 2011, 2012)
4×:  Facu Campazzo: (2010, 2011, 2012, 2014)
4×:  Nicolás Aguirre: (2015, 2016, 2017, 2018)

Bibliography
Liga Nacional de Básquetbol Guía Oficial 2015/2016, pages 209-216.

References

External links
LNB Official website 
Pick and Roll (LNB news, info & statistics)  
Argentinian LNB league at Latinbasket.com

Statistical Leaders